Reva Adi Utama (born 1 September 1996), is an Indonesian professional footballer who plays as a full-back for Liga 1 club Madura United.

Club career

Badak Lampung
In 2019, Reva Adi signed a contract with Indonesian Liga 1 club Badak Lampung. He made his debut on 1 September 2019 in a match against Persija Jakarta at the Patriot Candrabaga Stadium, Bekasi.

Barito Putera
He was signed for Barito Putera to play in the Liga 1 in the 2020 season. This season was suspended on 27 March 2020 due to the COVID-19 pandemic. The season was abandoned and was declared void on 20 January 2021.

Persebaya Surabaya
In 2021, Reva Adi signed a contract with Indonesian Liga 1 club Persebaya Surabaya. He made his debut on 24 September 2021 in a match against Bhayangkara at the Si Jalak Harupat Stadium, Soreang.

Madura United
Reva was signed for Madura United to play in Liga 1 in the 2022–23 season. He made his league debut on 23 July 2022 in a match against Barito Putera at the Gelora Ratu Pamelingan Stadium, Pamekasan.

Career statistics

Club

References

External links
 Reva Adi Utama at Soccerway
 Reva Adi Utama at Liga Indonesia

1996 births
Living people
Sportspeople from Makassar
Sportspeople from South Sulawesi
Liga 1 (Indonesia) players
PSM Makassar players
Badak Lampung F.C. players
PS Barito Putera players
Persebaya Surabaya players
Madura United F.C. players
Indonesian footballers
Association football defenders